Fabien Yves Jérôme Corbineau (born October 30, 1987), professionally known as Fabien Yoon or just Fabien, is a French model, actor, author and taekwondoka based in Seoul, South Korea. He was a member of the popular variety show I Live Alone. He was once part of the French Taekwondo national team for a short period of time before quitting due to injuries sustained during a competition.

In 2016, Fabien published a French cooking book about South Korean cuisine titled "La Cuisine Coréenne de Fabien Yoon" to promote South Korean culinary arts and techniques in his home country.
Fabien speaks five languages : French, English, Korean, Japanese and Spanish, and knows a smattering of Arabic and Italian.

Filmography

Drama and sitcom
Rookie Historian Goo Hae-ryung (MBC, 2019) - Jean Baptiste Barthélemy and Dominique Barthélemy
Mister Sunshine (tvN, 2018) - Leo
Joseon Kingdom Annals Talk (tvN, 2018) - Welteveree
Oh! Halmae (KBS1, 2015) - Chelsu
Hi! School: Love On (KBS2, 2014) - Philip
Goddess of Marriage (SBS, 2013)
I Miss You (MBC, 2012)
The King 2 Hearts (MBC, 2012) - Charly
Dr. Jin (MBC, 2012) - Ridel
I Live in Cheongdam-dong (JTBC, 2012)
Come, Come, Absolutely Come (MBN, 2012)
Lie to Me (SBS, 2011)
Queen of Reversals (MBC, 2010)
Secret Garden (SBS, 2010)
Jejungwon (SBS, 2010) - Evison
East of Eden (MBC, 2008)

Movies
Fashion King (2014) - Fabien (Himself)
Papa (2011) - Jimmy

TV Show
My Neighbor Charles (KBS1, since 2016)
The east sea expedition (Arirang TV, 2016)
Bring it On (Arirang TV, 2015)
Glimpse of Korea (Arirang TV, 2015)
My Little Kitchen (Arirang TV, 2015)
Woori mal Battle (KBS1, 2015, 2016)
Happy Together Season 3 (KBS2, 2015)
Best Ramyun (MBC Every1, 2014)
Hi! Stranger  (MBC, 2014)
Emergency Escape Number 1 (KBS2, 2014)
SNL Korea Season 5 (tvN, 2014)
Quiz Show The Four Musketeers (KBS2, 2014)
Whatta! Bubble gum Championship season 3 (One Game Net, 2014)
Queen of the Closet (QTV, 2014)
Star Flower (MBC, 2014)
Vitamin (KBS2, 2014)
Hello Counselor (KBS2, 2014)
Running Man (SBS, 2014, 2015)
Happy Together 3 (KBS2, 2014)
Cool Kiz On The Block (KBS2, 2014)
True Live Show (Story on, 2014)
Modoo Marble Tournament (On Game Net, 2014년)
Share TV - Like! (tvN, 2014)
Three Wheels (MBC, 2014)
I live alone (MBC, 2014)
Stylog (On Style, 2013)
Let's Go! Dream Team Season 2 (KBS2, 2013)
Nori Wang (KBS2, 2013)
From Start Till Clear (On Game Net, 2012)
Olive Show 2012 (Olive, 2012)
YOU CAN COOK (Olive, 2012)
Korea's Next Top Model Season 3 (On Style, 2012)
The Birth of The RIch (tvN, 2011)
Happy Train (MBC, 2011)
Yeo Yoo Man Man (KBS2, 2011)
Gag Concert (KBS2, 2011)
Martian Virus (tvN, 2011)
Get it Beauty 2011 (On Style, 2011)
Count Down Reality 48H!  (Channel View, 2010)
Section TV (MBC, 2010)
Survival Hanshik King (KBS2, 2009)
Woein Gudan (MBC, 2009)

Theater Play- Stage
Acoustic Love (2011)
Blind Season 2 (2010) - Sternberg

Music Video 
NIA - Goodbye (2010)
Seo Inyoung - Let's Break up (2013)

TV CF
2014  Kiturami
2014년 KT Telecom
2013년 Samsung - Galaxy S4
2012년 Fanta
2011년 GENIA 4
2009년 Kyochon Chicken

References

External links
 
 

1987 births
Living people
French male models
French male stage actors
French male television actors
French television personalities
French male taekwondo practitioners
Male actors from Paris
French expatriate sportspeople in South Korea